Slades Corners is a small unincorporated residential and agricultural community located on Old Highway 50 and 400th Avenue (Kenosha County Highway P, or Dyer Lake Road) in the western Kenosha County, Wisconsin town of Wheatland. Slades Corners is named for Tom Slade, an early resident who settled  there in approximately 1840, eight years before Wisconsin statehood.

Notes

Unincorporated communities in Wisconsin
Unincorporated communities in Kenosha County, Wisconsin